The 2020 MTV Video Music Awards Japan were held on October 29, 2020.

Main awards

Best video of the year
Aimyon - "Naked Heart"

Best Male video
Japan
Kenshi Yonezu - "Kanden"

International
The Weeknd - "Blinding Lights"

Best female video
Japan
Aimyon - "Naked Heart"
International
Dua Lipa - "Break My Heart"

Best group video
Japan
Official Hige Dandism - "I Love..."
International
BTS - "Dynamite"

Best new artist video
Japan
Macaroni Enpitsu - "Koibito-gokko"
International
Doja Cat - "Say So"

Best rock video
King Gnu - "Doron"

Best alternative video
Millennium Parade - "Fly With Me"

Best pop video
Little Glee Monster - "Ashiato"

Best R&B video
Fujii Kaze - "Nanina n w"

Best hip hop video
Creepy Nuts - "Katsute Tensaidatta Oretachie"

Best dance video
NiziU - "Make you happy"

Best collaboration video
Lisa - "Play the world!" with Pablo

Best art direction video
Generations from Exile Tribe - "One in a Million -kiseki no yoru ni-"

Best cinematography
Bish - "Letters"

Best choreography
Hinatazaka46 – "Seishun no uma"

Special awards

Artist of the year
Daiki Tsuneta

Song of the year
Yoasobi - "Yoru ni kakeru"

Best album of the year
Babymetal - Metal Galaxy

Music video breakthrough song
Eito - "Kōsui"

Best buzz award
Dish

Rising star award
JO1

Inspiration award Japan
E-girls

References

2020 in Japanese music
2020 music awards